Calgary was a federal electoral district in Alberta, Canada that was represented in the House of Commons of Canada from 1904 to 1917. It was located initially in the Northwest Territories. Following the creation of the province of Alberta in 1905, the riding was located in that province. (From 1905 to 1907, Calgary riding also included parts of Saskatchewan.)

History
This riding was created in 1903, and abolished in 1914 when it was redistributed between Calgary West, East Calgary and Macleod ridings.

Members of Parliament
This riding has elected the following member of the House of Commons of Canada:

Election results

See also

Calgary Calgary Alberta provincial electoral district
Calgary Northwest Territories territorial electoral district
List of Canadian federal electoral districts
Past Canadian electoral districts

References 
 
 
 

Former federal electoral districts of Northwest Territories
Former federal electoral districts of Alberta
Former federal electoral districts of Saskatchewan
Politics of Calgary